The 1999–2000 Slovenian Third League was the eight season of the Slovenian Third League, the third-highest level in the Slovenian football system.

League standings

Centre

East

North

West

See also
1999–2000 Slovenian Second League

References

External links
Football Association of Slovenia 

Slovenian Third League seasons
3
Slovenia